There were two waves of violence in Guinea in 2013, first in February and March, then in July.

Nine civilians died in political violence in Guinea in February 2013, after protesters took to the streets to voice their concerns over the transparency of the 2013 election. The demonstrations were fuelled by the opposition coalition's decision to withdraw from the electoral process in protest at the lack of transparency in the preparations for the election. Nine people were killed during the protests in early 2013, while around 220 were injured, and many of the deaths and injuries were caused by security forces using live fire on protesters.

In July 2013 there was ethno-religious fighting between the Fula (also Kpelles or Guerze) and Malinke (also Konianke) people, the latter forming the base of support for President Alpha Condé, with the former consisting mainly of the opposition. The July violence left 98 dead.

Background
The run up to the September 2013 election was full of controversy, with the process having been delayed four times until 12 May was agreed as the voting date. The parliamentary poll had originally been scheduled for 2011 but was delayed four times until 12 May was agreed. The election set for May 12 is intended to be the last step in the country's transition to civilian rule after two years under a violent army junta following the death of leader Lansana Conte in 2008, however it has now been postponed till September.

In September 2012, there were many complaints over the government's arbitrary arrest of protesting opposition supporters, 100 of whom were detained that month. This prompted the resignation of two Guinean opposition ministers. The president of Guinea's national election commission, Louceny Camara, was also forced to step down after numerous demands for his sacking; Camara was seen to be a keen ally of President Condé and was accused of helping to pre-rig the legislative polls in Condé's favour. Additionally, Guinean opposition parties announced that they would no longer participate in the National Transitional Council, which serves as an interim parliament, and would also boycott the national electoral commission.

The main cause of the political protests was the decision by the Guinean opposition coalition to withdraw from the electoral process on 24 February, which was followed by an appeal to citizens to stage nationwide protests. This decision was provoked in part by the National Electoral Commission's approval of South African software firm Waymark Infotech in compiling a new list of registered voters for the elections. The opposition argued that the firm is “open to voting fraud” as it was chosen by the ruling party and has a history of discrepancies in not just Guinea elections, but also other African elections. In September 2012, thousands of Guineans marched in Conakry in protest of Waymark only to be dispersed by police with tear gas.

The indigenous Guerze are mostly Christian or animist, while the Konianke are newer immigrants to the region who are Muslims and considered to be close to Liberia's Mandingo ethnic community. The former are considered to supportive of Liberian President Charles Taylor, while the former fought with rebels against the government in the Liberian civil war.

Protest and violence
Protests began on 27 February 2013 after the opposition coalition began to encourage and stage protests in the capital, Conakry. Thousands of pro-opposition supporters took to the streets and lashes broke out between rock-throwing youths and security forces armed with truncheons, guns and tear gas grenades. Around 130 people were injured on the first day, including 68 police. Police in anti-riot gear were posted in opposition strongholds in the capital the following day, with the first death reported that day. On Friday, the ethnic clashes commenced, with the pro-opposition Fula and the pro-government Malinke people fighting with knives and truncheons on the streets of the capital.

The violence worsened at the weekend after a teenager was shot by soldiers who opened fire indiscriminately on a street of protesters in Conakry, injuring several others. The fifteen-year-old was reportedly on his way to buy bread when he was shot at point blank range, along with 13 others who were allegedly not protesting at all, according to one witness. Two further reported deaths that weekend were also caused by gunfire.

On 4 March, the violence showed no signs of abating, with further clashes between protesters and government security forces leading to more dead and injured at the hands of gunfire, bringing the death toll to five people. The violence also spread to another city, Labé, a region known for its allegiance to opposition leader Cellou Dalein Diallo, 450 km from the capital. On Tuesday, two private radio stations, Planet FM and Renaissance FM, were attacked during the violence, in an incident that was condemned by The International Federation of Journalists.

Shots were fired at parts of Planet FM's recording studio as an opposition leader was being interviewed, while other acts of violence targeted the premises of Renaissance FM at night. No one claimed any responsibility for the attacks.
By Wednesday 6 March, the death toll had reached eight people after two more deaths the previous day, with violence reportedly reaching more towns in the country's interior.

Several weeks after the initial violence, reports also materialised of violence against another radio station, Lynx FM, with journalists revealing that supporters of the ruling party had threatened a reporter from the station on 27 February. The militants reportedly called her a spy and threatened to attack her on the grounds that she belonged to the Fula ethnic group, and shortly afterwards, she was forced to flee with a colleague from a violent, stone-throwing mob. A third reporter with Lynx FM, Asmaou Diallo, was assaulted by unknown assailants outside the RPG office despite wearing a press vest. She said the attackers slapped her after someone said she was an "opposition journalist."

Further tension was seen in the week after the riots, when thousands of opposition supporters marched in Conakry to mark the funerals of the nine people who died during the protests. Former Prime Minister Celou Dalein Diallo, now an opposition leader, gave a speech at the event, urging solidarity and unity after a week of violence. Despite the peaceful proceedings, security forces fired warning shots and tear gas to disperse the crowds, with one resident claiming shots were still heard, even after the crowds had left.

Renewed clashes (July 2013)
In the southern forest region petrol pump security guards of the Guerze tribe in Koule beat to death a Konianke youth who they accused of stealing on 15 July. Fighting then spread to the provincial capital N'Zerekore resulting in 80 people wounded and several homes destroyed. Though security forces were deployed to quell the fighting, and despite N'Zerekore Prefect Aboubacar Mbop Camara announcing a curfew, fighting initially continued. People were attacked with machetes, axes, sticks, stones and firearms as houses and cars were burnt. Guerze chief Molou Holamou Azaly Zogbelemou was also among those wounded. The initial death toll was put at 16 but rose through 17 July as bodies were collected from the streets and were put in the mortuary, even without identification due to the absence of limbs and identity papers. A medic from the hospital where the mortuary was located said that after all the victims were identified deaths from both communities as either burned alive or hacked to death.

After the deployments of troops to quell three days of violence, government spokesman Damantang Albert Camara said: "We're now doing a triage to find out who did what. Some were arrested with machetes or clubs but others had (hunting rifles) and military weapons." He also said that "we are today at around 100 dead - 76 victims in N'Zerekore and 22 others in Koule," while at least 160 more people were injured. The violence also followed an agreement to by opposing political parties to hold the election on 24 September 24 after street protests that sometimes resulted in ethnic clashes.

Government reaction
President Alpha Condé and the government appealed for calm throughout the violence, however they gave no official death toll to the media. The government said on 2 March that it would investigate whether the security forces had used live rounds on civilians.

Condé was in Ivory Coast at the time of the protests and flew back for talks with the opposition. This meeting that would discuss the preparations for May's vote was boycotted by the majority of the opposition, prompting further clashes.

Eventually, on 7 March, the Guinean government bowed to popular demand and postponed the 12 May election date "until further notice", upon the recommendations of the National Independent Electoral Commission (CENI). In a press statement, the Prime Minister Mohamed Said Fofana asserted the commitment of the government not to spare any effort to ease the political tension, with pledges of free and fair elections.

On 10 March, a Guinean court ordered opposition leaders to appear at a hearing scheduled for the 14 March, in which they would be questioned for their role in organising the protests. A government spokesman told Reuters that they would be facing a "civil procedure", following President Conde's call for those responsible for the violence and the pillaging of businesses to be brought to justice. Former Prime Minister Sidya Toure branded the summons as an "illegal procedure for what was an authorised march" and a "manipulation of justice for political ends".

The Guinean government also agreed to suspend poll preparations, prompting the opposition's agreement on 15 March to take part in preliminary talks to end the deadlock over the elections. Days later however, the opposition were to be found appealing for an international effort to help organise the legislative polls, after a "painful" dialogue with the government. Opposition leader Cellou Dalein Diallo blamed Interior Minister Alhassane Condé for the "mistrust between us and the government".

International reaction
On 2 March, the African Union announced it was deeply concerned about recent political developments in the country “that have degenerated into street clashes and violence and saw the loss of lives and destruction of property”. Its chairperson strongly urged all stakeholders to remain calm and engage in genuine dialogue on the way forward.

On 5 March, the European Union voiced concerns over the political unrest, and urged all concerned parties to “show restraint and resolve differences through a national dialogue”.

The United Nations human rights office and Ban Ki-Moon both denounced the violence in Guinea and called on authorities “to protect civilians and ensure all parties refrain from using violence to resolve disputes.”

Casualties

March 2013
March 1–6: 8 civilians killed in protests.

July 2013 
July 14–24: 98 people killed in sectarian violence.

References

Protests in Guinea
Conflicts in 2013
Politics of Guinea
Religion in Guinea
Freedom of assembly in Guinea
2013 protests
2013 in Guinea